Patrícia Nunes "Ticha" Penicheiro, OIH (September 18, 1974) is a Portuguese sports agent and former basketball player. She played for the Sacramento Monarchs in the WNBA for most of her professional career. She was a four-time WNBA All-Star and a three-time All-WNBA selection. Penicheiro is regarded as one of the best point guards of all time, ranking 2nd all-time for most career assists and leading the WNBA in assists seven times, as well as winning a WNBA championship with the Monarchs in 2005. She is a 2019 inductee of the Women's Basketball Hall of Fame.

College years
Penicheiro was born and raised in Figueira da Foz, Portugal. Penicheiro has played for professional clubs since her young teens, although she did not play at the senior level until after she starred in U.S. college basketball at Old Dominion University. She played at Old Dominion from 1994 to 1998 and helped lead the Lady Monarchs to the 1997 NCAA Championship game. In 1997, Penicheiro was named to the Final Four All-Tournament team. During her playing time at ODU, Penicheiro collected 1,304 career points and finished her career as ODU's all-time steal leader with 591. She is second all-time at ODU on the career assist list to another ODU great Nancy Lieberman with 939.  She is the Colonial Athletic Association's all-time leader in both assists and steals.

Penicheiro is a two-time Kodak All-American, selected in 1997 and 1998. She became ODU's second winner of the prestigious Lifetime/Wade Trophy and the first international player to win the honor.  A four-time All-CAA honoree, Ticha was named the conference's Player-of-the Year in 1995-96 and 1996-97 while also claiming the Rookie of the Year award in 1994–95. She graduated from Old Dominion in 1998 with degrees in communications and interdisciplinary studies, and was inducted into the ODU Sports Hall of Fame in 2006.

Old Dominion statistics 

Source

WNBA career

In 1998, Penicheiro joined the Sacramento Monarchs as a rookie, finishing third in the WNBA Rookie of the Year award voting. She is a four-time WNBA All-Star player. She has twice tied the WNBA's record with 16 assists in a single game.  In 1999, she was selected as a WNBA first-team player.  This was also the year she set her WNBA high in points, with 27 against the Minnesota Lynx. In 2001, she was selected as a member of the WNBA's second team.

She had, as of June 19, 2003, 1,027 career points in the WNBA; for an average of 6.8 per game, 1,121 assists; for a total of 7.5 per game, 615 rebounds; for a total of 4.1 per game, and 322 steals, for a total of 2.15 per game.

Penicheiro retired as the all-time WNBA leader in total assists and assists per game, although both records have since been surpassed, respectively by Sue Bird and Courtney Vandersloot. Penicheiro also holds the WNBA single-game record for most steals with 10.

Penicheiro is well known for her consistently flashy style of play.  In 2005, she helped the Sacramento Monarchs win their first ever WNBA championship title.

After the Monarchs franchise became defunct, Penicheiro signed with the Los Angeles Sparks. In 2011, her second year with the team, she was voted in by fans as one of the Top 15 players in the fifteen-year history of the WNBA.

In February 2012, Penicheiro signed with the Chicago Sky, but her season statistics were significantly diminished due to injuries, and on September 18, she announced that she would retire from the WNBA at the end of the 2012 season.

Penicheiro was inducted into the Virginia Sports Hall of Fame in 2014.

In 2016, Penicheiro was named in the WNBA Top 20@20, a list of the WNBA's top 20 players of all time in celebration of the league's twentieth anniversary. She was also named to the WNBA's 25th anniversary team, The W25, in 2021.

WNBA career statistics

Regular season

|-
| align="left" | 1998
| align="left" | Sacramento
| 30 || 30 || style="background:#D3D3D3"|36.0° || .333 || .233 || .642 || 4.7 || style="background:#D3D3D3"|7.5° || 2.2 || 0.1 || 3.87 || 6.3
|-
| align="left" | 1999
| align="left" | Sacramento
| 32 || 32 || 35.0 || .320 || .158 || .664 || 4.8 || style="background:#D3D3D3"|7.1° || 2.1 || 0.2 || 4.22 || 7.3
|-
| align="left" | 2000
| align="left" | Sacramento
| 30 || 30 || 31.2 || .368 || .200 || .579 || 3.0 || style="background:#D3D3D3"|7.9° || 2.3 || 0.2 || 2.37 || 6.9
|-
| align="left" | 2001
| align="left" | Sacramento
| 23 || 22 || 32.3 || .339 || .262 || .766 || 3.7 || style="background:#D3D3D3"|7.5° || 1.7 || 0.4 || 2.78 || 6.3
|-
| align="left" | 2002
| align="left" | Sacramento
| 24 || 24 || 35.5 || .377 || .250 || .728 || 4.3 || style="background:#D3D3D3"|8.0° || 2.7 || 0.0 || 2.88 || 8.5
|-
| align="left" | 2003
| align="left" | Sacramento
| 34 || 34 || 32.0 || .302 || .250 || .579 || 3.5 || style="background:#D3D3D3"|6.7° || 1.8 || 0.0 || 2.38 || 5.4
|-
| align="left" | 2004
| align="left" | Sacramento
| 32 || 32 || 29.4 || .354 || .338 || .714 || 3.1 || 4.9 || 1.9 || 0.1 || 2.18 || 6.0
|-
|style="text-align:left;background:#afe6ba;"| 2005†
| align="left" | Sacramento
| 34 || 33 || 27.3 || .314 || .195 || .790 || 2.9 || 4.4 || 1.4 || 0.2 || 1.97 || 5.7
|-
| align="left" | 2006
| align="left" | Sacramento
| 34 || 34 || 24.9 || .339 || .194 || .792 || 2.7 || 3.4 || 1.7 || 0.1 || 1.97 || 5.4
|-
| align="left" | 2007
| align="left" | Sacramento
| 32 || 32 || 23.7 || .314 || .214 || .822 || 2.6 || 4.5 || 1.5 || 0.0 || 1.88 || 5.7
|-
| align="left" | 2008
| align="left" | Sacramento
| 33 || 33 || 25.9 || .374 || .286 || .809 || 3.0 || 5.2 || 2.0 || 0.1 || 2.64 || 8.6
|-
| align="left" | 2009
| align="left" | Sacramento
| 30 || 28 || 24.1 || .324 || .111 || .814 || 2.7 || 5.2 || 1.0 || 0.1 || 2.13 || 4.9
|-
| align="left" | 2010
| align="left" | Los Angeles
| 32 || 30 || 26.3 || .410 || .111 || .819 || 4.0 || style="background:#D3D3D3"|6.9° || 1.3 || 0.1 || 2.25 || 4.9
|-
| align="left" | 2011
| align="left" | Los Angeles
| 34 || 23 || 23.7 || .486 || .417 || .868 || 2.8 || 4.8 || 0.8 || 0.1 || 2.09 || 6.0
|-
| align="left" | 2012
| align="left" | Chicago
| 18 || 5 || 12.8 || .375 || .200 || .545 || 1.3 || 2.1 || 0.4 || 0.2 || 2.00 || 1.8
|-
| align="left" | Career
| align="left" |15 years, 3 teams
| 453 || 422 || 28.2 || .351 || .248 || .731 || 3.3 || 5.7 || 1.7 || 0.1 || 2.50 || 6.1

Postseason

|-
| align="left" | 1999
| align="left" | Sacramento
| 1 || 1 || 20.0 || .200 || .000 || 1.000 || 4.0 || 3.0 || 1.0 || 0.0 || 2.00 || 4.0
|-
| align="left" | 2000
| align="left" | Sacramento
| 2 || 2 || 38.5 || .250 || .500 || .833 || 3.5 || style="background:#D3D3D3"|7.0° || 2.0 || 0.0 || 3.00 || 8.0
|-
| align="left" | 2001
| align="left" | Sacramento
| 5 || 5 || 32.6 || .250 || .368 || 1.000 || 3.8 || style="background:#D3D3D3"|6.6° || 0.6 || 0.8 || 1.80 || 6.2
|-
| align="left" | 2003
| align="left" | Sacramento
| 6 || 6 || 23.8 || .333 || .250 || .875 || 2.3 || 3.0 || 1.0 || 0.5 || 1.17 || 4.2
|-
| align="left" | 2004
| align="left" | Sacramento
| 6 || 6 || 32.2 || .222 || .133 || .688 || 3.3 || 5.3 || 2.5 || 0.3 || 3.17 || 4.2
|-
|style="text-align:left;background:#afe6ba;"| 2005†
| align="left" | Sacramento
| 6 || 6 || 27.0 || .323 || .000 || .800 || 4.0 || 5.2 || 1.0 || 0.2 || 2.33 || 5.3
|-
| align="left" | 2006
| align="left" | Sacramento
| 9 || 9 || 23.8 || .294 || .286 || .647 || 2.3 || 3.8 || 1.2 || 0.0 || 1.22 || 5.0
|-
| align="left" | 2007
| align="left" | Sacramento
| 3 || 3 || 23.0 || .273 || .000 || .600 || 2.3 || 5.0 || 2.3 || 0.0 || 3.33 || 6.0
|-
| align="left" | 2008
| align="left" | Sacramento
| 3 || 3 || 31.3 || .486 || .750 || .667 || 4.0 || style="background:#D3D3D3"|6.3° || 2.3 || 0.3 || 1.67 || 13.7
|-
| align="left" | 2010
| align="left" | Los Angeles
| 2 || 2 || 29.5 || .455 || .000 || 1.000 || 2.5 || 2.5 || 2.5 || 0.0 || 3.00 || 6.0
|-
| align="left" | Career
| align="left" |10 years, 2 teams
| 43 || 43 || 27.7 || .314 || .288 || .747 || 3.1 || 4.7 || 1.5 || 0.3 || 2.07 || 5.8

International career
Penicheiro was a member of Portugal's national women's basketball team. She was also on the Spartak Moscow Region team, with Tina Thompson, Sue Bird, and Diana Taurasi. She played for Galatasaray Medical Park of Turkey in the 2011–12 season.

Later career
When inducted into the Women's Basketball Hall of Fame in 2019, she was an active agent with about 30 clients, among them current WNBA players Kayla McBride and Courtney Vandersloot.

Personal life
Penicheiro is an ardent supporter of the Special Olympics and supports ovarian cancer research, to honor one of her best friends who was diagnosed with the disease. Besides her native Portuguese, she speaks English, Spanish and conversational Italian. Her father, João, is a former basketball player and now coaches her older brother, Paulo, who plays professionally in Portugal. She became an aunt when her brother and sister-in-law gave birth to their son João Miguel in 2009. Penicheiro also enjoys listening to R&B music and is an avid collector of watches and clothes. She had mentioned that during her playing career, she'd listened to Hip-Hop and R&B music before a game.

On February 20, 2013, Penicheiro became an American citizen, taking the oath with 1,200 others at the Sacramento Convention Center.

References

External links
 
 

1974 births
Living people
All-American college women's basketball players
American sports agents
Chicago Sky players
Galatasaray S.K. (women's basketball) players
Los Angeles Sparks players
Old Dominion Monarchs women's basketball players
People from Figueira da Foz
People with acquired American citizenship
Point guards
Portuguese expatriate basketball people in Russia
Portuguese expatriate basketball people in Turkey
Portuguese expatriate basketball people in the United States
Portuguese emigrants to the United States
Portuguese women's basketball players
Sacramento Monarchs players
Women's National Basketball Association All-Stars
Sportspeople from Coimbra District